Elleanor Eldridge (March 1784/1785 –  1845) was an African-American/Native American entrepreneur and memoirist from Rhode Island. She is best known for the Memoirs of Elleanor Eldridge (16mo., Providence: B.T. Albro, 1838), which was co-authored with Frances Harriet Whipple Green McDougall.  Another edition was published in 1840, and still another in 1842. This volume of 128 pages was published for the purpose of enabling the subject of it to repurchase some property of which she had been perhaps legally, but at all events unfairly, deprived.

Early years
Elleanor Eldridge was born in Warwick, Rhode Island, March 1784.

Her maternal grandmother, Mary Fuller, was a Native American, belonging to the small tribe or clan, called the Fuller family; which was probably a portion of the Narragansett people. Certain it is that this tribe or family once held great possessions in large tracts of land, with a portion of which Mary Fuller purchased her husband Thomas Prophet; who, until his marriage, had been a slave. Her grandfather had been kidnapped at the mouth of the Congo River, on board a ship upon which he had been enticed for the purposes of trade. He was brought to Rhode Island, where he was sold as a slave. Mary Fuller, having witnessed the departing glories of her tribes, died in extreme old age, at the house of her son, Caleb Prophet, being 102 years old. She was buried at the Thomas Greene burying place in Warwick, in the year 1780. Her daughter Hannah married Robin Eldridge, the father of Elleanor.

Career

By dint of hard work and prudence, she was enabled to purchase a lot of land on Spring Street, in Providence, upon which she built a house, several times enlarging it until it became, to her, a valuable property, and was nearly paid for. On this loan, she paid an annual interest of ten per cent.

Being taken sick, she rented her property and went away to recover her strength. While gone, the gentleman from whom she borrowed the  died, leaving his estate to his brother. This brother attached Elleanor's property, sold it by the sheriff, and he himself bought it for exactly the amount of the mortgage.

She was not a woman who would submit quietly to such proceedings, and immediately set herself to work to obtain justice. General Ray Greene, Attorney General, assisted her, as did many of the best citizens of Providence, to whom she was well known. To assist in raising money, Memoirs of Elleanor Eldridge was written, and several editions sold. A companion volume, entitled Elleanor's Second Book, was published in 1847. These efforts were successful. Eldridge recovered her property after paying heavily for it, and lived to old age. She died about 1845.

Notes

References

Attribution

Bibliography

External links
 "Memoirs of Elleanor Eldridge: Electronic Edition."

A

1780s births
1840s deaths
19th-century American women writers
People from Warwick, Rhode Island
Writers from Rhode Island
19th-century American memoirists
American women memoirists
African-American writers
Native American writers